The Right Book Club was an English book club founded in 1937 by Christina and William Foyle to counter the influential Left Book Club, established in 1936 by Victor Gollancz.

Origins and character
In May 1936 the Left Book Club had been established, and towards the end of 1936 a group of “neo-Tories” mooted the idea of a right-wing book club. Christina Foyle and her father William Foyle undertook to organize it, and the Club was launched at a luncheon at the Grosvenor House Hotel in April 1937, with John Baird, 1st Viscount Stonehaven, the recently-retired Chairman of the Conservative Party, presiding.

The Right Book Club published one book every month, occasionally acting as first publisher, but more often reprinting a recent new title from a mainstream publisher. Its members received a monthly magazine, and meetings with authors were also held. Membership was free, and members committed themselves to buying the monthly book, which cost 2s 6d (half a crown). The first book appeared in June 1937.

Arthur Bryant saw the Right Book Club as too radical, and responded by founding a similar monthly book club, the National Book Association, which he intended to be more moderate, and Stanley Baldwin agreed to be its President. However, in January 1939 Bryant's association published an expurgated translation of Hitler's Mein Kampf. Baldwin resigned in protest, and this proved to be the last book the NBA published.

By 1939, the Right Book Club claimed 20,000 subscribers, in comparison with some 50,000 members of the Left Book Club and 5,000 of the National Book Association. On 3 November 1939 the humorist A. G. Macdonell replied to an invitation from Christina Foyle to join the Club, "I had no idea that there were twenty thousand members of the Right in politics who could read."

Whereas all volumes of the Left Book Club had the same appearance, a soft binding coloured solid orange, with plain black lettering, the Right Book Club described its books as "on good quality paper, with attractive STIFF binding and dignified coloured jacket". A commentator has said that this was a subtly English way to distance the two clubs: "The bindings are as stiff as a colonel's upper lip, not limp as a lounge lizard's handshake." 

In 2022, the critic Clive Bloom made the claim that the Right Book Club was "thought up by Sir Oswald Mosley to promote fascism", without providing any source for this claim.

Endorsements
In the club's early days, three notable figures gave endorsements of it.

In a posthumous message written shortly before his death, Austen Chamberlain, a former Conservative Party leader, commented "I welcome the appearance of the 'Right' Book Club. I have learned to trust the judgment of our people when the truth is made available to them."

George Lloyd, 1st Baron Lloyd, a Conservative on the "Diehard" wing of the party, said "I am glad to learn of the popularity and progress of the 'Right' Book Club. A great responsibility as well as an opportunity of doing work of last national importance lies before the Club."

Lord Sempill, a well-known aviator, said "The work which you are doing deserves the support of all thinking men and women."

Selection committee
A committee aimed to select one book per month for publication and consisted of 
Anthony Ludovici, Norman Thwaites, Trevor Blakemore, Collinson Owen, and W. A. Foyle.

Principal authors
The writers of more than one book published by the Right Book Club were:
Bernard Newman, four books 
Quentin Reynolds, three books
Siegfried Sassoon, three books 
Edvard Beneš, three books
W. H. Chamberlin, two books
Ivor Halstead, two books 
Douglas Jerrold, two books
Viscount Lymington, two books
Charles Petrie, two books
George Sava, two books
Clarence K. Streit, two books 
Arnold Wilson, two books
Gerald Kersh, two books
Henry Williamson, two books

Other authors included Clare Hollingworth, Hesketh Pearson, Ian Hay, Hugh Kingsmill, Edward Shanks, James Bridie, Arnold Lunn, Aubrey Jones, R. Welldon Finn, C. E. Vulliamy, Mairin Mitchell, and Harley Williams.

Patrons
The published list of the club’s patrons included:

Publications
 Rex Welldon Finn, The English Heritage (June 1937)
 Laurence Housman, Victoria Regina (July 1937)
 W. H. Chamberlin, A False Utopia (August 1937), an inside picture of Communism and Fascism.
 C. J. M. Alport, Kingdoms in Partnership (September 1937), the story of the Imperial Commonwealth.
 G. Ward Price, I Know These Dictators (October 1937), a "close up" of Hitler and Mussolini.
 Harold Cardozo, The March of a Nation: My Year of Spain's Civil War (November 1937), an account of the Spanish War by an English war correspondent
 Douglas Jerrold, Georgian Adventure (December 1937), about King George V's reign
 Sir Charles Petrie, Lords of the Inland Sea: A Study of the Mediterranean Powers (1937)
 Fred E. Beal, Word from Nowhere (January 1938), an indictment of the Communist system
 Sir Charles Petrie, The Chamberlain Tradition (February 1938) about Joseph, Austen and Neville Chamberlain.
 W. H. Chamberlin, Japan Over Asia (March 1938), an interpretation of Japan's foreign policy
 Viscount Lymington, Famine in England (April 1938), the case for a constructive social policy on health and well-being 
 William Teeling, Why Britain Prospers (May 1938), a study of current political and economic conditions
 Sir Arnold Wilson, Thoughts and Talks (June 1938), thoughts of a Member of Parliament
 W. S. Shears, This England (July 1938), a guide to rural England
 Eugene Lyons, Assignment in Utopia (August 1938), a critique of the Soviet Union 
 Sir Philip Gibbs, Ordeal in England (September 1938), a commentary on current events 
 Prince Christopher of Greece, Memoirs by H.R.H. Prince Christopher of Greece (October 1938)
 A. J. Mackenzie, Propaganda Boom (November 1938) a study of propaganda in totalitarian states
 William Foss and Cecil Gerahty, Spanish Arena (December 1938), an account of the Spanish Civil War
Arnold Wilson Walks and Talks Abroad in 1934–36 (1939)
Edith Sitwell, Victoria of England (July 1939)
 Arnold Lunn, Revolutionary Socialism in Theory and Practice (1939)
 "Watchman" (Vyvyan Adams), Right Honourable Gentlemen (1940)
Bernard Newman, The Secrets of German Espionage (1940)
 A. G. Street, A Year of My Life (1940)
 W. G. Krivitsly, I Was Stalin's Agent (1940)
 Ralph Ingersoll, Report on England (1941) 
L. De Jong, Holland Fights the Nazis (1941)
Ivor Halstead, Wings of Victory: a tribute to the R.A.F. (1941)
 Clarence K. Streit, Union Now With Britain (1941)
 Stephen Leacock, Our British empire: its structure, its history, its strength (1941)
 Edward Ardizzone, Baggage to the Enemy (1942), experiences in France and Belgium, illustrated by the author
 Mairin Mitchell, Back to England: an Account of the Author's Travels on the Continent from 1937 to 1939 and Her Observations on Wartime Conditions in Britain in 1940 (1942)
Ivor Halstead, Heroes of the Atlantic: a tribute to the Merchant Navy (1942)
Storm Jameson, The Fort (1942)
Hermann Rauschning, Make and Break with the Nazis (1942)
Gerald Kersh, The Nine Lives of Bill Nelson (1943)
Robert Henriques, Captain Smith and Company (1944) 
Noel Coward, Middle East Diary (1945)
 Viscount Lymington, Alternative to Death: the Relationship between Soil, Family, and Community (1945)
Douglas Dixon, Adventure is Never Done (1946) 
Alexander Woollcott, Long, Long Ago (1946)
Herbert Hodge, A Cockney on Main Street (1946)
Henry Williamson, The Sun in the Sands (1946)
Robert S. Arbib Jr., Here we are together: the notebook of an American Soldier in Britain (1947)
Aubrey Jones, The Pendulum of Politics (1947)
Clifton Reynolds, Autobiography (1947)
Siegfried Sassoon, Siegfried's journey, 1916-1920 (1947)
C. E. Vulliamy,  Ursa Major: a study of Dr. Johnson and his friends (1948)
Charlotte Haldane, Truth Will Out (1949, autobiography)
Hesketh Pearson, Talking of Dick Whittington (1949) 
Harley Williams, The Healing Touch (January 1949), 
Godfrey Winn, The Bend of the River: a journey in ten stages (1949)
Viscount Grey of Fallodon, The Charm of Birds (1950)
A. J. P. Taylor, From Napoleon to Stalin: Comments on European History (1950)
John Fothergill, An Innkeeper's Diary (undated)

Notes

Further reading
 Terence Rodgers, "The Right Book Club: text wars, modernity and cultural politics in the late thirties" in Literature & History 12.2 (2003), pp. 1–15

External links
Right Book Club at PublishingHistory.com
Right Book Club, Open Library

Book publishing companies of the United Kingdom
Publishing companies established in 1937
Political book publishing companies
Book clubs
Series of books
1937 establishments in the United Kingdom
Publishing companies disestablished in 2007